This is a list of Mexican television related events from 2004.

Events
16 May - Radio and TV host Eduardo Videgaray wins the third season of Big Brother VIP.
4 July - Actress and TV host Roxanna Castellanos wins the fourth season of Big Brother VIP.

Debuts

Television shows

1970s
Plaza Sésamo (1972–present)

2000s
Big Brother México (2002-2005, 2015–present)

Ending this year

Births

Deaths

See also
List of Mexican films of 2003
2003 in Mexico